Adventures in Silverado is a 1948 American Western film directed by Phil Karlson and written by Kenneth Gamet, Tom Kilpatrick and Jo Pagano. The film stars William Bishop, Gloria Henry, Edgar Buchanan, Forrest Tucker, Edgar Barrier and Irving Bacon. The film was released on March 25, 1948, by Columbia Pictures.

Plot
Silverado is a faraway land where simple folk, reckless cowboys and tough outlaws alike seek to go. But not everyone can get there - the long journey is fraught with many dangers. Only he who manages not to lose heart in a difficult moment, who is only the fastest and bravest can see Silverado.

Cast          
William Bishop as Bill Foss
Gloria Henry as Jeannie Manning
Edgar Buchanan as Dr. H. C. Henderson
Forrest Tucker as Zeke Butler
Edgar Barrier as Robert Louis Stevenson
Irving Bacon as Jake Willis
Joseph Crehan as E.J. McHugh
Paul E. Burns as Sam Perkins
Patti Brady as Lucy
Fred F. Sears as Hatfield 
Joe Wong as Tim Quong
Charles Cane as Sheriff
Eddy Waller as Will Thatcher
Netta Packer as Mrs. Thatcher
Trevor Bardette as Mike

References

External links
 

1948 films
1940s English-language films
American Western (genre) films
1948 Western (genre) films
Columbia Pictures films
Films directed by Phil Karlson
American black-and-white films
Revisionist Western (genre) films
1940s American films